Castanopsis eyrei is a species of flowering plant in the family Fagaceae, native to southern China, and Taiwan. It is used as a street tree in a number of southern Chinese cities.

References

eyrei
Flora of South-Central China
Flora of Southeast China
Flora of Taiwan
Plants described in 1904